Dum TV Kannada is a Kannada 24x7 Entertainment channel. It was owned by Enterr10 Television Network Pvt. Ltd. This channel was launched on 28 September and launched by the brand ambassador and Kannada Film Actress Hariprriya. This channel broadcast Kannada movies and Kannada shows that were dubbed from their own sister channel Dangal and some shows were taken from Sony Sab and Sony Entertainment Television.

Former shows
Beladingala Bale
Ramayana
Sai Baba
Nagavalli
Shani Ninna Mahime
Paramatma
Tenali Rama
Sindhu
Crime Alert

References

External links 
 Official facebook page of Dum TV Kannada
Kannada-language television
Television channels and stations established in 2020
Kannada-language television channels